The black-capped flycatcher (Empidonax atriceps) is a very small passerine bird in the tyrant flycatcher family. It is endemic to the highlands of Costa Rica and western Panama.

This species is found in the high canopy of mountain oak forest, coming lower at the edges and in clearings, and also in second growth and bushy pastures. It breeds mainly in the highest forested areas, from 2450 m to 3300 (even 4000) m altitude, but will descend to as low as 1850 m in the height of the rainy season.

The cup nest is made of grass and mosses and lined with plant fibre; it hangs from grass at the top of an earth bank, or is placed 2–12 m high in a vertical tree fork. The typical clutch is two unmarked cream or white eggs. Incubation by the female is 14–15 days to hatching, with another 17 days to fledging.

The black-capped flycatcher is 11.5 cm long and weighs 9 g. Most of its head and the rear of its neck are sooty black, the upperparts are olive-brown and the underparts are paler brown, becoming whitish on the throat and yellower on the lower belly. The head has a broad white eye ring, broken above the eye. The wings and tail are blackish, the former having two pale brown wing bars.  The sexes are similar, but young birds have a browner head and paler wing bars. The call is a whistled kip and the song is a loud keer keer.

This species is easily distinguished from migratory Empidonax flycatchers by its blackish head and generally dark appearance.

Black-capped flycatchers are tame, active birds, usually seen alone when not breeding. They eat insects, often taken in flight in short sallies from an open perch.

References

 Stiles and Skutch,  A guide to the birds of Costa Rica  

black-capped flycatcher
Birds of the Talamancan montane forests
black-capped flycatcher
black-capped flycatcher